2014 NCAA All-American may refer to:
2014 NCAA Men's Basketball All-Americans
2014 College Baseball All-America Team
2014 College Football All-America Team